The 1947 World Table Tennis Championships – Corbillon Cup (women's team) was the seventh edition of the women's team championship. 

England won the gold medal defeating Hungary 3–0 in the final. Czechoslovakia and the United States won bronze medals after finishing second in their respective groups. The actual trophy had been lost during the war so a replica trophy was awarded.

Medalists

Team

Final tables

Group A

+ withdrew / * withdrew after 2 games

Group B

Final

See also
List of World Table Tennis Championships medalists

References

-
-